Heinerscheid is a small town in northern Luxembourg, in the commune of Clervaux.

It was its own commune until its merger with Clervaux in 2009.

, the town of Heinerscheid has a population of 580.

Former commune
The former commune consisted of the villages:

 Fischbach (Fëschbech)
 Grindhausen (Grandsen)
 Heinerscheid (Hengescht)
 Hupperdange (Hëpperdang)
 Kalborn (Kaalber)
 Lieler (Léiler)
 Fossenhof (Fossenhaff) (lieu-dit)
 Kaesfurt (Kéisfuert) (lieu-dit)
 Kalborn-Moulin (Kaalber Millen) (lieu-dit)
 Lausdorn (Lausduer) (lieu-dit) - partially shared with the Commune of Wäisswampech
 Tintesmühle (Tëntesmillen) (lieu-dit)

References

 
Communes in Clervaux (canton)
Towns in Luxembourg